The Volga Tatars or simply Tatars are a Turkic ethnic group native to the Volga-Ural region of Russia. They are subdivided into various subgroups. Volga Tatars are Russia's second-largest ethnicity after the Russians. Most of them live in Tatarstan and Bashkortostan. Their native language is the Kipchak-Bolgar Tatar, and traditionally majority are Sunni Muslims.

History

In 1926 population census, different subgroups of now Volga Tatars identified themselves by their own names rather. After this, they were grouped together as "Tatars".

During Russian Empire, they were also generally known as Tatars, and eventually, the name was extended to most of the other Turkic peoples of Russia as well. (Azeris - Transcaucasian Tatars). The history of the ethnonym traces back to the times of Golden Horde, when its feudal nobility used it to denote its citizens. Russian feudals and the Tsar government started using it also. These different tribes usually identified themselves by their group name, or, generally as Muslims. Bolgar-name also was referenced. It is suggested, that they avoided using the term also, because it connected them negatively to the Mongol-Tatars of the past.

Nowadays, many of the ethnic differences between Tatar groups of Volga have disappeared. Some, especially unique dialectical features remain, and they are still separated into their own Tatar-groups within Volga Tatars.

The majority of Volga Tatars (Kazan Tatars and Mishars) are usually thought to be descendants of either the Kipchaks of Golden Horde, or Bolgars, that survived the Mongol conquest of 1236–1237. Some say that these two theories should not be in opposition to each other. Their history is connected to other tribes as well.

During the 14th century, Sunni Islam was adopted by many of the Tatars. They became subjects of Russia after the Siege of Kazan in 1552.

The 1921–1922 famine in Tatarstan was a period of mass starvation and drought that took place in the Tatar ASSR as a result of war communism policy, in which 500 thousand to 2 million peasants died. The event was part of the greater Russian famine of 1921–22 that affected other parts of the USSR, in which up 5 million people died in total.

Tatar authorities have attempted since the 1990s, after the dissolution of the Soviet Union, to reverse the Russification of Tatarstan that took place during the Soviet period.

Status in Russia

Language 

Tatar is a Turkic language which belongs to the sub-branch of Kipchak languages and a group called Kipchak–Bulgar. According to 2002 cencus, there were 5,3 million Tatar speakers in Russia, and in 2010, 4,3 million. (Tatar should not be confused with Crimean Tatar, which is a language to its own).

Tatar can be divided into two main dialects (some think Siberian Tatar is a third)

 Central (Kazan - most common and also the literary language)
 Western (Mishar) 

After the new 2017 curriculum, Tatar can now be taught to a student only if there is a written parental approval, and no more than two hours per week. The decision was apparently based on the complaints that parents of Russian students had made. President Vladimir Putin stated, that "a person should not be forced to learn a language, that is not his mother language". (In Tatarstan, there were 1,574,804 Russians in 2021, as in 40.3%).

Tatars and Russians 

After Russians, Volga Tatars are the second biggest ethnic group in Russia.

The long and multifaceted history between these two ethnic groups can be traced back to the times of Volga Bulgaria and the Golden Horde. Tatars have been a part of Russia since the 1500s. Later, among Tatars, there is both people, who see Russians as their adversaries, one way or another, and continue their independence pursuits, and those, who emphasize their unity, in all of its complexities. A representative of the first group can be portrayed by the ethnic nationalist, founder of independence party İttifaq, Fäwziyä Bäyrämova, and the second, by the Grand Mufti of Russia, supporter of Eurasianism, Tälğät Tacetdin.

The national poet Ğabdulla Tuqay wrote, in response to the Tatar emigration to Turkey that was happening in late 1800s and early 1900s: "Here we were born, here we grew up, and here the moment of our death will come. Fate itself has bound us to this Russian land".

Subgroups

Kazan Tatars

The majority of Volga Tatars are Kazan Tatars. (Qazan tatarları / qazanlılar).They form the bulk of the Tatar population of Tatarstan. Traditionally, they inhabit the left bank of Volga River. They were finally formed during Khanate of Kazan. (1438–1552).

A. Rorlich sees the history as follows: Khazar invasions forced the Bulgars, Turkic people, to migrate from the Azov steppes to the Middle Volga and lower Kama region during the first half of the eighth century. In the period of 10th–13th centuries, other Turkic peoples, including Kipchaks, migrated from Southern Siberia to Europe. They played a significant role in the Mongol invasion of Rus' in the 13th century. Tatar ethnogenesis took place after migrated Turkic peoples, mixed with the local Bulgar population and other inhabitants of the Volga River area, kept Kipchak dialect and became Muslims. Several new Tatar states had emerged by the 1500s after the Golden Horde fell. These states were Khanate of Kazan, Astrakhan Khanate, Khanate of Sibir, and Crimean Khanate.

Controversy surrounds the origin of the Tatar people, whether they are descended either from Bulgars or Golden Horde. According to one theory, Kazan Tatar heritage can be traced back to Kipchaks of the Golden Horde, yet according to another theory, the Tatars emerged from the Bulgar culture that survived the Mongol conquest of 1236–1237. Ever since the mid 1970s, however, a viewpoint has risen, that these two theories should not be in contrary to each other, but rather, in symbiosis, stating that they cannot simply claim only Bulgars as their ancestors. (See: Bulgarism). 

The President of the Bulgar National Congress, Gusman Khalilov appealed to the European Court of Human Rights on the issue of renaming the Tatars into Bulgars, but in 2010 he lost in court. 

Şihabetdin Märcani during late 1800s encouraged the Kazan Tatars to identify as Tatar, despite its possible negative connotations.

Mishar Tatars

Mishar Tatars, or Mishars (mişär tatarları, mişärlär) are an ethnographic group of Volga Tatars speaking Mishar dialect of the Tatar language. They comprise approximately one third of the Volga Tatar population. After migration waves from late 1500s to 1700s, they settled especially on the right bank of Volga and Urals. Increased contacts with Kazan Tatars made these two groups even closer, and thus, "Tatar nation" was born; eventually replacing previously used regional names. Due to this, the sub-group conciousness was also weakened. G. Tagirdzhanov thought that the ancestors of both Kazan Tatars and Mishars were originally from Volga Bulgaria. He proposed, that Mishars descended from the Esegel tribe. 

The ethnogenesis of the Mishars is contested, but they are often thought of being the descendants of Kipchaks of the Golden Horde, one way or another. Their ethnic formation finally happened in Qasim Khanate during 1400–1500s. In addition to Kipchaks, Mishars' ancestors are often linked to Meshchera, Burtas, Bolgars and Eastern Hungarian tribes.

Even though the Mishars have been influenced by Russians, probably more so than the Kazan Tatars, the dialect in Nizhny Novgorod Oblast has been said to resemble the ancient Kipchak dialect. According to A. Leitzinger, Mishar dialect has more Kipchak, and Kazan dialect more Bolgar influence. A. Orlov states: "Nizhny Novogord Tatars (Mishars) are one of the original Tatar groups, who maintain the continuity of Kipchak-Turkic language, culture and tradition".

Traditionally, Mishars have populated the western side of the Volga River. Nowadays the majority presumably lives in Moscow. Finnish Tatars are originally Mishars also.

In 1897 census, the number of Mishars was 622 600. Their number varies greatly.

Kasimov Tatars

Kasimov Tatars (Qasıym tatarları) have their capital in the town of Kasimov, Ryazan Oblast. They were formed during the Qasim Khanate. The number of Kasimov Tatars in 2002 was suspected to be less than 1000. In late 1800s and early 1900s, some Kasimov Tatars are known to have relocated to the regions of Kazan, Simbirsk, Nizhny Novgorod, Orenburg, and also Central-Asia.

According to S. Ishkhakov, the Kasimov Tatars were an "ethnically transitional group between Kazan Tatars and Mishar Tatars." Kasimov Tatars took part in the Conquest of Kazan and in wars against Sweden in troops of Ivan the Terrible. In some sources, Mishars are called Kasimov Tatars. (They were also largely formed in Qasim Khanate.)

Kasimov Tatars (Self name: Kaçim / Käçim tatarları / xalkı) speak the central (Kazan) dialect of Tatar language. In their dialect there is Mishar and Nogai influence.

The first female Tatar mathematician, graduate of Sorbonne University and recipient of Hero of the Soviet Union, S. K. Shakulova  (1887–1964) is said to have been a Kasimov Tatar.

Nukrat Tatars 
Nukrat Tatars (Noqrat tatarları) live mainly in Udmurtia (Yukamensky, Glazovsky, Balezinsky, Yarsky districts) and Kirov Oblast. They are divided into subgroups Nukrat and Chepetsky. They speak Tatar with characteristic of the southern Udmurt. Their name comes from the village of Noqrat, which was first mentioned in 1542 along with the cities of the Vyatka land. Their formation was influenced by Udmurts and the Besermyan. They practice Islam.

In 1920s the number of Nukrat Tatars was around 15,000 people.

Perm Tatars
Perm Tatars (Perm' tatarları), also known as the Ostyaks in Russian sources during 15th and early 17th century, live mainly in the Perm Krai and Sverdlovsk Oblast. The Ostyaks were in the sphere of influence of the Kazan Khanate as a separate ethno-political entity (Ostyak, or Kostyak land). One significant ethnic component of the Perm Tatars was the Nogai-Kipchak population of the Perm region. Also, Kazan Tatars and partly Mishars who moved from the Middle Volga region to the Perm Territory in 16th - early 17th centuries had an influence. Perm Tatars are divided into 4 subgroups: Mullinskaya, Kungurskaya, Tanypovskaya and Krasnoufimskaya.
In early 1900s their number was 52 700 thousand people. Like the Tatar majority, they practice Islam.

Kryashens

A policy of Christianization of the Muslim Tatars was enacted by the Russian authorities, beginning in 1552, resulting in the emergence of Kryashens (keräşen / keräşennär), also known as "Christianized Tatars".

Many Volga Tatars were forcibly Christianized by Ivan the Terrible during the 16th century, and continued to face forced baptisms and conversions under subsequent Russian rulers and Orthodox clergy up to the mid-eighteenth century.

Kryahsen Tatars live in much of the Volga-Ural area. Today, they tend to be assimilated among the Russians and other Tatar groups. 

Some of the Kryashens speak the Kazan dialect, others Mishar dialect. In 2010 census, 34,882 identified as Kryashens.

Other groups 
Teptyars (tiptär), Nagaibaks (nağaybäklär) and Astrakhan Tatars (Ästerxan tatarları) can also be included as Volga Tatars according to some.

Teptyars live in Perm Krai, the southeast part of Tatarstan, and northwestern Bashkortostan. Most of them speak the Kazan dialect of Tatar language, and some speak Bashkir. According to one theory, originally Teptyars formed a special peasant group, which, in addition to the Tatars, included Bashkirs, Chuvash, Maris, Udmurts and Mordvins. In 1790, the Teptyars were transferred to the ranks of the military service class, and the Teptyar Regiment was formed. During the Patriotic War of 1812, the 1st Teptyar Regiment under the command of Major Temirov took part in the fighting as part of a separate Cossack troops of Matvei Platov. To this day, there is controversy on whether they should be classified as either Tatars or Bashkirs. In early 1900s, their number was estimated to be 382 000.

The Nagaibaks live in Chelyabinsk Oblast of Russia. They are Orthodox Christian and multiple researchers think they originated from Christianized Nogais of Nogai Khanate. Other theories exist however. They speak Nagaibak, a sub-dialect of the middle dialect of Tatar. A 2002 census recorded 9 600 Nagaibaks.

Astarkhan Tatars are a regional ethnic group. In 1989,  71 700 Tatars lived in Astrakhan Oblast. They are separated into three subgroups: Jurtov and Kundrov Tatars, and the Karagash. One theory connects the Jurtov and Karagash to Nogai. Another proposes that Jurtov descend from Astarkhan Khanate. A considerable part of the Astrakhan Tatars are descendants of the Volga Tatars who moved to the area in the 18th and 19th centuries. As early as 1702, local Tatar vomen married Kazan Tatars. At the end of the 18th century, Volga and Ural Tatars began to move to the countryside, where they founded new villages or settled in the same villages with local Tatars. By the beginning of the 20th century, the settlers who mainly mixed with the Jurtov Tatars already made up more than a third of the local Tatar population.

Tatar literature

Tatar literature has an ancient history. Before the introduction of printing, ancient Tatar books written in Arabic script were copied by hand. Manuscripts of the Koran, other spiritual literature, educational books were widely distributed. One of the earliest works of national Tatar literature known is considered to be written at the beginning of the 13th century by the famous poet Qol Ğäli, the poetic work Qíssa-i Yosıf (قصه یوسف, Tale of Yusuf). The first printed edition in the Tatar language was the Manifesto of Peter I on the occasion of the Persian campaign, published in 1722.

As their literary language, Tatars used a local variant of Türki until early 1900s. Its norms began to move towards the spoken vernacular from the mid 1800s. The basis for a new literary language was created by migration and urbanization. The vocabulary and phonetics of it is based mostly on the Kazan Dialect and the morphology on Mishar Dialect.

Notable Tatar writers in 19th and 20th centuries are for example Ğabdulla Tuqay, Ğälimcan İbrahimov, Fatix Ämirxan, Ğädel Qutuy and Musa Cälil. More recent writers include Robert Miñnullin.

Theater 
The first professional Tatar theater group Säyär (Сәйяр) emerged in early 1907 in Uralsk. This group is thought of being the basis for the Galiaskar Kamal Tatar Academic theatre, located in Kazan, Tatarstan. Today, the theater's repertoire mainly includes plays in the Tatar language, but also some plays written by Russians and others. For people who do not speak the language, an opportunity has been arranged to watch Tatar plays with translation. Among notable Tatar playwrights are Mirxäydär Fäyzi, Kärim Tinçurin, Ğäliäsğär Kamal and Ğayaz İsxaqıy.

Islam in Volga-Urals 

The Islamic roots of the Volga region trace back to Volga Bulgaria (922). Since then, Islam also has a centuries old history in Russia. Volga Tatars played a significant role in the national and cultural movements of Muslims during Russian Empire and also in Soviet Union. Islam is currently the majority religion in Tatarstan.

In September 2010, Eid al-Fitr and May 21, the day the Volga Bulgars embraced Islam, were made public holidays. During those times the president of Tatarstan negotiated for use of Islamic banking and the first halal food production facility opened with foreign companies expressing their interest to expand the project in Tatarstan.

Radicalism 
Most notable example of radical Islam among Tatars is the formation İttifaq, whose leader Fauziya Bayramova sided with the Salafists in the 2000s. Imam of the Al-Ikhlas mosque in Kazan, Rustem Safin, was under a suspended two-year sentence for his association with HuT. There were a few dozen Tatars fighting with the separatists during the two Chechen Wars. In 2010, the Interior Ministry of Tatarstan closed down a short lived assembly in Nurlatsky District, which had tried to emulate the Dagestani jamaat of the 1990s.

The term “Caucasization of Tatarstan” or Volga-Urals has been coined to describe some of the radical Islamic elements found in the region, that mainly come from the Caucasus. Muslim migration from Central-Asia has also played a part. In 2006, Doku Umarov stated: "We will never separate the lands of the Caucasus from the Volga region. . . . We will also liberate other lands occupied by Rusnya [a derogatory Chechen term for Russia]. These include Astrakhan and the lands along the Volga that are under the hoof of the Russian kafirs.”

The radical form of Islam has appeared among Tatars and Bashkir only occasionally.  Also, many of the young are not active Muslims and are Russified. The former head of the Spiritual Board of the Muslims of the Nizhny Novgorod Region Umar Idrisov believes, that “Unlike their fellow Muslims abroad, Russian Muslims are Europeans, who grew up with traditional all-Russian values, including Christian ones.”

Population figures
Tatars inhabiting the Republic of Tatarstan, a federal subject of Russia, constitute one third of all Tatars, while the other two thirds reside outside Tatarstan. Some of the communities residing outside Tatarstan developed before the Russian Revolution of 1917, as Tatars were specialized in trading.
In the 1910s, they numbered about half a million in the area of Kazan. Nearly 2 million Volga Tatars died in the 1921–22 famine in Tatarstan. Some 15,000 belonging to the same stem had either migrated to Ryazan in the center of Russia (what is now European Russia) or had been settled as prisoners during the 16th and 17th centuries in Lithuania (Vilnius, Grodno, and Podolia). Some 2,000 resided in St. Petersburg.
Volga-Ural Tatars number nearly 7 million, mostly in Russia and the republics of the former Soviet Union. While the bulk of the population is found in Tatarstan (around 2 million) and neighbouring regions, significant number of Volga-Ural Tatars live in Siberia, Central Asia, and the Caucasus.  Outside of Tatarstan, urban Tatars usually speak Russian as their first language (in cities such as Moscow, Saint-Petersburg, Nizhniy Novgorod, Ufa, and cities of the Ural and Siberia).

In 2021, there were  5,310,649 Tatars in Russia.

Genetics
According to over 100 samples from the Tatarstan DNA project, the most common Y-DNA haplogroup of the ethnic Volga Tatars is Haplogroup R1a (over 20%), predominantly from the R1a-Z93 subclade.
Haplogroup N is the other significant haplogroup. According to different data, J2a or J2b may be the more common subclade of Haplogroup J2 in Volga Tatars. The haplogroups C and Q are among the more rare haplogroups.

Haplogroups in Volga Tatars (122 samples):
C2: 2%
E: 4% (V13: 3%)
G2a: 2%
I1: 6%
I2a1: 5%
I2a2: 2%
J2a: 7%
J2b: 2%
L1: 2%
N1c2: 9%
N1c1: 16%
O3: 2%
Q1: 2%
R1a: 33% (Z282: 19%, Z93: 14%)

According to Mylyarchuk et al.: among 197 Kazan Tatars and Mishars.

The study of Suslova et al. found indications of two non-Kipchak sources of admixture, Finno-Ugric and Bulgar:

Volga Tatars, along with Maris, Finns, and Karelians, all cluster genetically with northern and eastern Russians, and are distinct from southern and western Russians. The scientists also found differences in relationships among some of the northern and eastern Russians.

According to a genetic study on mitochondrial haplogroups, Volga Tatars reveal roughly 90% West-Eurasian and 10% East-Eurasian maternal haplogroups.

According to a full genome study by Triska et al. 2017, the Volga Tatars "bear very little traces of East Asian or Central Siberian ancestry. Volga Tatar are a mix between Bulgar who carried a large Finno-Ugric component, Pecheneg, Kuman, Khazar, local Finno-Ugric tribes, and even Alan. Therefore, Volga Tatars are predominantly European ethnicity with a tiny contribution of East-Asian component. As most Tatar’ IBD is shared with various Turkic and Uralic populations from Volga-Ural region, an amalgamation of various cultures is evident. When the original Finno-Ugric speaking people were conquered by Turkic tribes, both Tatar and Chuvash are likely to have experience language replacement, while retaining their genetic core".

Connection to Hungarians has been made also. Genetic data found that among "Western Turkic speakers, like Chuvash and Volga Tatar, the East Asian component was detected only in low amounts (~ 5%)", linking them to both Magyar conquerors and the historical Bolgars.

The three regional groups of Tatars (Volga, Crimean, Siberian) do not have common ancestors and thus, their formation occurred independently of each other.

Notable Tatars

 Aida Garifullina, opera singer
 Rinat Akhmetov, businessman and billionaire
 Ilmir Hazetdinov, ski jumper
 Marat Kabayev, former football player and coach
 Ymär Daher, cultural worker, researcher
 Timur Safin, foil fencer
 Artur Akhmatkhuzin, foil fencer
 Gulnaz Gubaydullina, modern pentathlete
 Yusuf Akçura, politician, ideolog of Pan-Turkism
 Mirsaid Sultan-Galiev, politician, Communist, ideolog of Pan-Turkism and anti-colonialism
 Nail Yakupov, professional ice hockey player in Canada, the US and Russia
 Reşit Rahmeti Arat, linguist
 Sadri Maksudi Arsal, statesman, scholar
 Irina Shayk, model (Tatar father)
 Alina Zagitova, figure skater and Olympic gold medallist
 Atik Ismail, football player
 Rudolf Nureyev, greatest male ballet dancer of the generation
 Aliya Mustafina, artistic gymnast and 7-time Olympic medallist (Tatar father)
 Zemfira, rock musician
 Dinara Safina, professional tennis player
 Marat Safin, professional tennis player
 Kamila Valieva, figure skater, the 2022 European champion
 Emil Sayfutdinov, speedway rider

See also

Tatar cuisine
Sabantuy
Bulgarism
Tatar nobility
Chinese Tatars
Crimean Tatars
Lipka Tatars
Finnish Tatars
Tatars of Kazakhstan
Tartary
Little Tartary
Idel-Ural State

References

Further reading 
 
 

 Smith, Graham,  ed. The Nationalities Question in the Soviet Union (2nd ed. 1995), pp 277–89.

External links

Tatars in Congress Library (1989)
The Origins of the Volga Tatars
Tatar.Net
 The tatars
 Tatar Name
 Tatar history
 Tatar world-wide server
 Tatar Names
 Anthropology of Tatars. By R.K. Urazmanova and S.V. Cheshko
 Tatar Electronic Library
 Tatar music & video catalog

 
Ethnic groups in Russia
Ethnic groups in Uzbekistan
Ethnic groups in Kazakhstan
Ethnic groups in Ukraine
Khanate of Kazan
Qasim Khanate
History of Ural
Indigenous peoples of the Subarctic